Hana Rural District is a rural district (dehestan) in Bakhtegan County, Fars Province, Iran. At the 2006 census, its population was 9,751, in 2,201 families. The rural district has 32 villages.

References 

Rural Districts of Fars Province
Neyriz County